Mongol Post is the national postal service of Mongolia. The formerly state-owned Mongol Post was transformed into a joint stock company on April 11, 2016, by offering 34 percent of the total shares to the public. It was founded by the Mongolian People's Republic in 1935 and went under several different names before its current structure was established in 1994. The Mongol Post JSC is charge of postal services, delivery and issuing of postage stamps.
The headquarters are in Ulaanbaatar, and the company employs over 900 people and has over 389 post offices.

Services

The company is charged with providing the following  postal and communication services at the pot offices.
 Basic postal services (handling and delivering mail and parcels)
 Additional postal services (registered mail, customer pick-up, P.O. box, logistics, sales of postal products such as postcard, envelope, stamps)
 International postal services
 Express Mail Services (EMS)
 Postal Insurance
Of Mongolia's 3 million inhabitants, 30% are nomadic, and 61% of Ulaanbaatar's population live in informal settlements. This population had "no consistent addressing system" until May 2016 when Mongol Post started using a geocoding system provided by what3words.

History
The modern postal system of Mongolia started with the establishment of a state committee for post and telegraph by the Mongolian People's Republic. From 1935 the postal system had a succession of names commencing as the 'City Post Committee', including 'Central Post', 'Telegraph, Post and Communication Office', until 2002 when finally renamed Mongol Post.

The  'Mongol Post Bank',  a private bank that operated from 1994 to 2009, was never related to the  'Mongol Post'  organisation.

International postal service 
For international mail, as of 2010, the following postal rates apply:

 postcard — 400 tugriks;
 a letter weighing up to 20 g — 550 tugriks;
 package (for 1 kg) — from 14 to 27 US dollars;
 depending on the country of destination.
Express mail is available to a limited number of foreign countries. At the same time, the postal fee for 1 kg of a parcel ranges from $25 to $40, depending on the country of destination.

In addition to the official postal operator, the following express delivery services operate in Mongolia:

 EMS;
 DHL;
 TNT etc.

Mongol Shuudan Bank 
In 1993, the Post Bank of Mongolia (Mongol. Mongol Shuudan Bank, English Mongol Post Bank) was established. However, by the second half of the 2000s, he had large tax debts to the state. In 2009, a decision was made to merge this financial and credit institution with the Savings Bank of Mongolia (Mong. Khadgalamzhiin Bank, English Savings Bank), which was successfully completed in 2010.

See also
 Postage stamps and postal history of Mongolia
 Mongol Shuudan, a rock band from Russia named after the Mongol Post

References

External links

 Mongolian postal address format by UPU

Government agencies of Mongolia
Mongolia